Hashim Nadeem is a Pakistani-Urdu novelist, poet and screenwriter from Pakistan. Through his scripts of the television serials, he established himself among the well-known writers of the industry. Began his screenwriting career in late 2010s, Nadeem is also the recipient of Lux Style Award and President's Pride of Performance.

Nadeem's popular novels include Bachpan Ka December, Abdullah and Khuda Aur Muhabbat. He first shot into fame in 2012 with spiritual romance Khuda Aur Muhabbat (season 1), which was based on his own novel of the same name, and later followed by two seasons. In 2015, he made his cinematic debut by directing the drama, Abdullah: The Final Witness. His later scripts include Dhaani, Visaal and Ishq Zahe Naseeb, the later of which earned him a nomination of Best TV Writer at Lux Style Awards. He gained critical acclaim with the adaptation of his own novel, Parizaad.

Early life 
He was born in Quetta, Balochistan. He got his early education in cadet college Pataro, after studying at the Bolan Medical College. He passed civil service examination in 1996 and served as Assistant. commissioner in Quetta.
Raqse Bismil novel 2020

List of novels 
 Bachpan Ka December
 Khuda Aur Muhabbat
 Abdullah
 Abdullah II
 Saleeb-e-Ishq
 Aik Muhabbat aur Sahi
 Muqaddas
 Parizaad
 Emaan, Umeed Aur Mohabbat

Television dramas

Accolades

References 

People from Quetta
Urdu-language novelists
Pakistani novelists
Date of birth missing (living people)
Living people
Recipients of the Pride of Performance
Urdu-language fiction writers
21st-century Urdu-language writers
Urdu-language dramatists and playwrights
Pakistani dramatists and playwrights
Urdu-language television writers
Year of birth missing (living people)